The Mamas are a Swedish-American soul and gospel group. They won Melodifestivalen 2020 with their single "Move", which reached number one in Sweden in March 2020.

Career
The group consists of Ashley Haynes (born 19 January 1987 in Washington, D.C.), Loulou Lamotte (born 16 April 1981 in Malmö) and Dinah Yonas Manna (born 5 September 1981 in Stockholm). Founding member Paris Renita left the group in 2019.

As a four-piece, the group provided backing vocals for John Lundvik's Melodifestivalen 2019 entry "Too Late for Love". Lundvik went on to win the competition and got to represent Sweden in the Eurovision Song Contest 2019 held in Tel Aviv, Israel, with the Mamas continuing to provide backing vocals. The song finished 5th in the grand final on 18 May 2019.

In late 2019, it was announced that the Mamas (without Paris Renita) would take part in Melodifestivalen in 2020, this time in their own right with their entry "Move". They performed in the first heat on 1 February 2020 in Linköping, and qualified directly for the final that took place on 7 March 2020 in the Friends Arena in Stockholm.

The Mamas went on to win Melodifestivalen 2020 with a total of 137 points, meaning they would represent Sweden in the Eurovision Song Contest 2020 held in Rotterdam, Netherlands. The contest was cancelled in March 2020 due to the COVID-19 pandemic.

They returned the following year and participated in Melodifestivalen 2021 with the song "In the Middle". They performed in the fourth heat on 27 February 2021 and qualified directly for the final which was held on 13 March 2021 at the Annexet in Stockholm. The Mamas finished in 3rd place in the final with a total of 106 points.

The Mamas played on the Swedish Socialdemocratic Workers Party international workers day celebrations in May 2021. In November 2021, they released their third EP Won't Let the Sun Go Down.

Discography

Extended plays

Singles

Other charted songs

Notes

References

External links

Musical groups established in 2019
Swedish musical trios
Swedish soul musical groups
Gospel music groups
Women's musical groups
Musical backing groups
Eurovision Song Contest entrants of 2020
Eurovision Song Contest entrants for Sweden
Melodifestivalen winners
Melodifestivalen contestants of 2021
Melodifestivalen contestants of 2020
Melodifestivalen contestants of 2019